is the sixteenth single by Japanese recording artist Alisa Mizuki. It was released on February 3, 1999, as the fourth single from Mizuki's fifth studio album Innocence. The title track was written by Hiromi Mori, composed by T2ya, and produced by Tourbillon keyboardist Hiroaki Hayama. It served as theme song for the Fuji TV drama Tenshi no Oshigoto, starring Mizuki herself. The B-side, "Previous Days," was written and produced by Amii Ozaki.

Chart performance 
"Asahi no Ataru Hashi" debuted on the Oricon Weekly Singles chart at number 33 with 9,480 copies sold in its first week. The single charted for three weeks and has sold a total of 11,490 copies.

Track listing

Charts and sales

References 

1999 singles
Alisa Mizuki songs
Japanese television drama theme songs
Songs written by T2ya
1999 songs